Venkataramana Bhagavathar (1781–1874) was a direct disciple of Saint Thyagaraja and a composer of Carnatic music. Bhagavathar composed his songs in Saurashtra language and has left behind a number of kritis.

Early life
Bhagavathar was born in 1781 to a Saurashtra Brahmin family in Ayyampettai in present-day Thanjavur district of Tamil Nadu. He was born to Nannusamy as a fifth child making him the grandson of Kuppaiyer who was a priest, belonging to Dadheecha gotra from Ariyalur in present-day Tiruchirappalli district. Bhagavathar was a scholar, composed more than 150 keerthanas and is well versed in Sanskrit, Telugu, and Saurashtra. He was one of the prime disciples of Saint Tyagaraja. His son, Krishnaswamy Bhagavathar, was also a disciple of Tyagaraja. It was the father-son duo who preserved many of the keerthanas of Tyagaraja and passed them on to posterity. He is popularly known as Walajahpet Venkataramana Bhagavatar after he settled in Wallajapet, a small town in Vellore district.

References

Carnatic composers
1781 births
1874 deaths